The Jordan Medical Journal is a peer-reviewed medical journal that is published by the University of Jordan Deanship of Scientific Research and the Ministry of Higher Education and Scientific Research in Jordan.

It was established in 1966 and covers the fields of medical sciences.

External links

References 

Publications established in 1966
English-language journals
Biannual journals
General medical journals
University of Jordan